A Hustler's Diary is a 2017 Swedish comedy film directed by Ivica Zubak.

Best Screenplay award nomination at the 53rd Guldbagge Awards. Audience Award at the 2017 Warsaw Film Festival.

Cast 
 Lena Endre - Lena
 Madeleine Martin - Nathalie Vallsten
 Shebly Niavarani - Omar Najafi
  - Puma Andersson

References

External links 

2017 comedy films
Swedish comedy films
2010s Swedish films
2010s Swedish-language films